Kotlin-class destroyers were Cold War era ships built for the Soviet Navy. The Russian name for this class was Project 56 Spokoiny (Спокойный, "tranquil"). 27 ships were built between 1955 and 1958; they were all decommissioned in the late 1980s. The  is based on the design of the Kotlins. The Chinese Luda class which is based on the Soviet , also borrows some design concepts from the Kotlin class.

Design
This design was a smaller version of the Neustrashimy-class destroyer which was seen as being too large and expensive for economic series production, as well as too slow. Detailed design changes eliminated some of the problems seen during trials of Neustrashimy. A production run of 100 ships was planned but this was curtailed because of the advent of the guided missile. 32 were ordered, but four ships were completed as the Kildin class (Project 56E/EM).  The last vessel was canceled.

11 ships (Project 56PLO, "Kotlin Mod.") were modified for enhanced ASW capabilities by adding rocket depth charge launchers.

In 1962, the Soviet Navy installed the navalized version of the S-125 Neva, the SA-N-1 'Goa', to a surface-to-air missile Kotlin-class destroyer, Bravy (also spelled Bravyy/Bravyi) for testing. Fire control and guidance was provided by 4R90 Yatagan radar. The system could track only one target at a time. The missiles were loaded on the dual-arm ZIF-101 launcher, with under-deck magazine storage for 16 more.

The Soviet Navy would eventually retrofit seven Kotlin-class ships to carry SAMs; these ships were known to NATO as the Kotlin SAM class (Project 56A). One more was modified and sold to Poland (Project 56AE, being the only Project 56 destroyer exported). Later versions of the SAM system, such as the Volna-M (SA-N-1B), the Volna-P, and Volna-N provided greater missile range and capability.

Ships

 Bravy -  was the Kotlin SAM prototype

The ships were scrapped between 1987 and 1990.

See also
List of ships of the Soviet Navy
List of ships of Russia by project number

References

Bibliography
 Also published as

External links

Federation of American Scientists:  Project 56 Kotlin class, Project 56-A Kotlin SAM class, Project 56-PLO Kotlin Mod class Destroyer
All Russian Kotlin Class Destroyers - Complete Ship List 

Destroyer classes